Talkhehdan or Talkheh Dan may refer to various places in Iran:
 Talkhehdan, Chaharmahal and Bakhtiari
 Talkheh Dan, Kohgiluyeh and Boyer-Ahmad
 Talkheh Dan-e Bozorg Amirabad, Kohgiluyeh and Boyer-Ahmad Province
 Talkheh Dan-e Jowkar, Kohgiluyeh and Boyer-Ahmad Province
 Talkheh Dan-e Olya, Kohgiluyeh and Boyer-Ahmad Province
 Talkheh Dan-e Run, Kohgiluyeh and Boyer-Ahmad Province